Sasheer Zamata Moore (born May 6, 1986) is an American actress, stand-up comedian, and singer. Zamata is best known for her tenure as a cast member on the NBC sketch comedy series Saturday Night Live from 2014 to 2017. Since her departure from SNL, she has garnered wider attention for her leading roles in the TV series Woke (2020–2022) and Home Economics (2021–present). She has served as a celebrity ambassador for the American Civil Liberties Union.

Early life

Zamata is the daughter of American parents, Ivory Steward and Henry Moore, a lieutenant colonel in the US Air Force. She was born in Okinawa, Japan, because of her father's military career. She is the great-granddaughter of Leroy Washington Mahon, a formerly enslaved man who founded the town of Fargo, Arkansas.

Zamata was raised in Indianapolis, Indiana. She is a graduate of Pike High School. She stated her parents named her after the alien flower-like crystal called the "Sahsheer" from the Star Trek episode "By Any Other Name".

She attended the University of Virginia, and graduated with a Bachelor of Arts degree. Zamata was a founding member of the University's long-form improv comedy troupe, Amuse Bouche. While a student at UVA, she participated in the Disney College Program for one semester, where she portrayed various costumed characters.

Career

Zamata has performed regularly at the Upright Citizens Brigade Theatre in New York City since 2009. She co-starred in the ABC News hidden camera series Would You Fall for That? and was a cast member on MTV's series Hey Girl. Zamata also appeared in sketches on Totally Biased with W. Kamau Bell and Inside Amy Schumer. She stars in the webseries Pursuit of Sexiness. Additionally, she has appeared in sketches for CollegeHumor.

Videos on Zamata's YouTube channel include impersonations of Michelle Obama, Rihanna, Nicki Minaj, Tyra Banks, and Beyoncé.

Zamata also voices the character Sally in Call of Duty: Infinite Warfare Zombie mode. In 2021, Zamata voiced the character Mary in Muppets Haunted Mansion.

She co-hosts Best Friends, a podcast with best friend and fellow comedian, Nicole Byer.

Saturday Night Live
In 2014, Zamata joined the cast of NBC's Saturday Night Live (SNL) during its 39th season. She joined the SNL cast amid a season in which TV critics and black comedians had criticized the show for not being ethnically diverse (specifically, not hiring any black female cast members at the start of the new season and only having five of them in the near-40 years the show has been on the air).  Zamata was the first black female cast member on SNL since biracial Maya Rudolph departed midway through the show's 33rd season in 2007.

Zamata debuted on SNL as a featured player in the January 18, 2014 episode hosted by Drake, in which she impersonated Rihanna. She was promoted to repertory player in the first episode of Season 41. Some of her recurring characters include Janelle, a teenage girl who hosts a YouTube channel called How 2 Dance with Janelle but is unaware of how her developing sexuality is coming off to viewers, and Keeley, a contestant on an African-American centric version of Jeopardy! called Black Jeopardy! Some of her celebrity impressions have included the aforementioned Rihanna, Michelle Obama, Kerry Washington, Nicki Minaj, Beyoncé, Solange Knowles, Diana Ross, Lupita Nyong'o, and Taraji P. Henson. She left the show in 2017 after the season 42 finale.

ACLU and work with women's rights
Zamata was named a celebrity ambassador to the American Civil Liberties Union (ACLU) in 2015, and began work with the Women's Rights Project. The ACLU Women's Rights project seeks to break down gender biases and "ensure equal economic opportunities, educational equity, and an end to gender-based violence". She has spoken out on gender discrimination in the U.S. today, and has advocated for equal rights among women of color, in particular. In an interview with Allure, Zamata opened up about her experiences with discrimination and colorism. She has stated that although she has often been stigmatized for her darker skin tone, she hopes to turn her experiences into a message of self-acceptance and body positivity for women in all shades.

Filmography

Film

Television

References

External links

1986 births
Living people
21st-century American actresses
21st-century American comedians
Actresses from Indianapolis
African-American actresses
African-American female comedians
American expatriates in Japan
American film actresses
American impressionists (entertainers)
American sketch comedians
American television actresses
American voice actresses
American women comedians
Comedians from Indiana
University of Virginia alumni
Upright Citizens Brigade Theater performers
21st-century African-American women
21st-century African-American people
20th-century African-American people
20th-century African-American women